The following are important identities in vector algebra. Identities that involve the magnitude of a vector , or the dot product (scalar product) of two vectors A·B, apply to vectors in any dimension. Identities that use the cross product (vector product) A×B are defined only in three dimensions.

Magnitudes

The magnitude of a vector A can be expressed using the dot product:

In three-dimensional Euclidean space, the magnitude of a vector is determined from its three components using Pythagoras' theorem:

Inequalities

The Cauchy–Schwarz inequality: 
The triangle inequality: 
The reverse triangle inequality:

Angles

The vector product and the scalar product of two vectors define the angle between them, say θ:

To satisfy the right-hand rule, for positive θ, vector B is counter-clockwise from A, and for negative θ it is clockwise.

The Pythagorean trigonometric identity then provides:

If a vector A = (Ax, Ay, Az) makes angles α, β, γ with an orthogonal set of x-, y- and z-axes, then:

and analogously for angles β, γ. Consequently:

with  unit vectors along the axis directions.

Areas and volumes

The area Σ of a parallelogram with sides A and B containing the angle θ is:

which will be recognized as the magnitude of the vector cross product of the vectors A and B lying along the sides of the parallelogram. That is:

(If A, B are two-dimensional vectors, this is equal to the determinant of the 2 × 2 matrix with rows A, B.) The square of this expression is:

where Γ(A, B) is the Gram determinant of A and B defined by:

In a similar fashion, the squared volume V of a parallelepiped spanned by the three vectors A, B, C is given by the Gram determinant of the three vectors:

This process can be extended to n-dimensions.

Addition and multiplication of vectors

 Commutativity of addition: .
 Commutativity of scalar product: .
 Anticommutativity of cross product: .
 Distributivity of multiplication by a scalar over addition: . 
 Distributivity of scalar product over addition: .
 Distributivity of vector product over addition: .
 Scalar triple product: 
 Vector triple product: .
 Jacobi identity: 
 Binet-Cauchy identity: 
 Lagrange's identity: .
 Vector quadruple product: 
 A consequence of the previous equation: 
In 3 dimensions, a vector D can be expressed in terms of basis vectors {A,B,C} as:

See also
Vector space
Geometric algebra

Notes

References

 
Mathematical identities
Mathematics-related lists